Titsiana Booberini is a 1997 Australian short film directed by Robert Luketic, written by and starring Tania Lacy, also starring Sophie Lee, and Roz Hammond.

Initially entered at the Telluride Film Festival and the Sundance Film Festival, the film's success led to it being screened at film festivals all over the world. It won "Best Film" at the Aspen Shortsfest, and lead actress Tania Lacy's performance won her the "Best Actress Award" at the Exposure Film Festival in Brisbane. Its positive reception at Sundance caught the interest of several high-profile studios, leading to Luketic being offered the directing position for Legally Blonde. At one point in 1998, there were plans to make a full-length version with Miramax.

The film is a musical comedy, with the story focusing on Titsiana Booberini, an Italian check-out girl at a suburban supermarket who is ridiculed by her fellow employees for her slightly hirsute upper lip. Titsiana gains new confidence and acceptance when she discovers a hair removal treatment.

Cast
Tania Lacy - Titsiana Booberini
Sophie Lee - Francine Pickles
Roz Hammond - Carol Johnson
David J. Berman - Chubus Zarbo
Marc Savoia - Stock boy

References

External links

1997 films
1997 short films
Australian comedy short films
Films directed by Robert Luketic
1990s English-language films
1990s Australian films